Gaultier may refer to:

People
Grégory Gaultier (born 1982), French squash player
Bon Gaultier, British writer
Denis Gaultier (1597 or 1602/3–1672), French lutenist and composer
Ennemond Gaultier (c.1575–1651), French lutenist and composer
Jacques Gaultier (c.1600–1652), French lutenist
Jean-Jacques Gaultier (born 1963), member of the National Assembly of France
Jean Paul Gaultier (born 1952), French fashion designer
Jules de Gaultier (1858–1942), French philosopher
Pierre Gaultier (c. 1599–1681), French scholar, lutenist and composer
Pierre Gaultier de Varennes, sieur de La Vérendrye (1685–1749), French Canadian military officer, fur trader and explorer
Walter of Pontoise (c.1030–c.1099), French saint, also known as Gaultier
Léon Gaultier (1915–1997), French collaborator
Léonard Gaultier (1561–1641), French engraver

Other uses
Gaultier (barony), a barony in County Waterford, Republic of Ireland
Gaultier GAA, a Gaelic Athletic Association club in Dunmore East, County Waterford, Ireland

See also
Gauleiter, a Nazi German regional commander
Leopoldo Galtieri (1926–2003), Argentine general, president, and junta leader
Gotye (born 1980), Belgian-Australian musician, singer, songwriter
Gautier (disambiguation)
Gauthier (disambiguation)
Vautier, a surname

Surnames of French origin
Surnames from given names